The 2022 Men's U22 European Volleyball Championship was the inaugural edition of the Men's U22 European Volleyball Championship, a biennial international volleyball tournament organized by the European Volleyball Confederation (CEV). The tournament was held in Poland (host city Tarnów) from 12 to 17 July 2022.

Qualification

Pools composition 
The drawing of lots was held on 1 June 2022.

Venue

Preliminary round

Pool I 

|}

|}

Pool II 

|}

|}

Final round

Semifinals 

|}

3rd-place match 

|}

Final 

|}

Final standing

Awards 
At the conclusion of the tournament, the following players were selected as the tournament dream team.

Most Valuable Player
  Paolo Porro
Best Setter
  Kellian Paes
Best Outside Spikers
  Tommaso Rinaldi
  Michał Gierżot

Best Middle Blockers
  Francesco Comparoni
  Karol Urbanowicz
Best Opposite Spiker
  Ibrahim Lawani
Best Libero
  Thibault Loubeyre

References

External links
Official website

Men's Junior European Volleyball Championship
2022 in men's volleyball
2022 in youth sport
July 2022 sports events in Poland
International volleyball competitions hosted by Poland
Sport in Tarnów